The Steve Harvey Morning Show is a national radio program which is currently broadcast from Los Angeles.  The nationally syndicated show features host Steve Harvey and a team of comedians and commentators.

The show runs approximately four hours each weekday, with a "best of" show airing on some affiliates on Saturdays.  Harvey focuses on comedy and current events.  The music includes current and past urban adult contemporary and some gospel hits.  Most affiliated stations are programmed for African-American listeners. An abbreviated version of the show (usually cut down to under 90 minutes, without the music) is also uploaded daily on the show's YouTube channel as well as a podcast.

Broadcast history

The show was originally syndicated under Radio One, Inc., a minority-owned broadcasting company, now called Urban One.  It ran from September 2000 until May 2005. Despite efforts to syndicate the show nationally, ultimately, it aired only in L.A., on 100.3 KKBT, and in Dallas on 97.9 KBFB, both stations owned by Radio One. Harvey split his time between the Dallas and L.A. studios.  As a result, Harvey and Radio One decided to part ways shortly before his contract expired.

In September 2005, Harvey signed a joint syndication deal with Premiere Radio Networks and Inner City Broadcasting Corporation for a new incarnation of The Steve Harvey Morning Show.  In March 2009, it was announced that The Steve Harvey Morning Show would replace The Tom Joyner Morning Show in Chicago on WVAZ, which was Joyner's flagship station.

In February 2017, it was announced that the program would move to Los Angeles KJLH to accommodate Harvey's new LA-based TV talk show, which replaced one that was produced in Chicago.

Harvey signed a multiyear extension with Premiere in October 2021.

References

External links

American variety radio programs
IHeartRadio digital channels